Rev. from DVL was a Japanese idol girl group formed in 2011, as a successor to vocal and dance group DVL. It was formed as a local idol group for major activities within Fukuoka Prefecture, and was managed under ActiveHakata.

History
Rev. from DVL originated from a co-ed dance and vocal group formed in 2003, initially under the name "DVL", which stands for "dance", "vocal" and "love", but in 2011, with the rise in idol groups in Japan, it reformed as a girl group, and was renamed "Rev. from DVL", with "Rev." being the short form for "revolution", signifying the evolution from DVL's revolution concept.

Shortly after its formation, the group was to originally participate in activities within Fukuoka Prefecture. However, between October and November 2013, a photograph of Kanna Hashimoto went viral on the Internet, causing her and the group to achieve a higher level of popularity.

In June 2014, under Yoshimoto R and C, Rev. from DVL released their first single, "LOVE-arigatou-". With 13,000 original copies sold, it ranked sixth place on the weekly Oricon Singles Chart. Since then, the group released more singles, and had their own radio and television programs, and their popularity spread from Fukuoka Prefecture to the whole of Japan.

On February 6, 2017, Rev. from DVL announced that it would disband on March 31, 2017. They released their album, NEVER SAY GOODBYE -arigatou, and held a final pair of concerts in Tokyo and Fukuoka, on March 29 and March 31 respectively, prior to their disbandment.

Members

Past members
 (2003-2017)
 (2006-2017)
 (2007-2017)
 (2007-2017)
 (2009-2017)
 (2009-2016)
 (2009-2016)
 (2010-2017)
 (2010-2016)
 (2011-2015)
 (2012-2017)
 (2012-2017)
 (2014-2017)
 (2015-2017)

Discography

Albums

Singles

References

External links
 

Musical groups established in 2011
Musical groups from Fukuoka Prefecture
2011 establishments in Japan
2017 disestablishments in Japan
Japanese idol groups
Japanese girl groups